Howard Matthew Gargan (December 12, 1886 – January 21, 1945) was an American football player and coach. He Served as the head football coach at Fordham University from  1908 to 1909 and at Rutgers University from 1910 to 1912, compiling a career college football record of 22–12–6.

In 1917, he joined the United States Army but did not see combat in Europe. He attained the rank of captain and resigned from the Army in 1927, having served in Fort Riley, Kansas and Fort Dix, New Jersey.

Head coaching record

References

1886 births
1945 deaths
Fordham Rams football coaches
Fordham Rams football players
Rutgers Scarlet Knights football coaches
Players of American football from New York City